Paul Najjar, (born May 16, 1995) known as Pawl, is a Swedish-Lebanese DJ, artist, producer and songwriter.  He released his debut single "Set My Heart On Fire" on 27 May 2015; it hit number 11 on the Swedish dance chart list and was put into rotation on Swedish national radio station P3. His second single, "White Lie", was released seven months later on 1 December 2015 and was also put into rotation on Swedish radio station P3.
His third single,"Lost" was released on 6 May 2016.

References

Living people
1995 births
Swedish record producers
Swedish songwriters
Swedish DJs
Electronic dance music DJs